DVPB-HD (Digital Video Processing Board - High Definition)  is a prototyping board based on Texas Instruments DaVinci Technology.

It has many of the required peripheral interfaces support such as:
CVBS
Component Video
HDMI
Audio
Giga-Bit Ethernet
RS-232
RS-485
USB 2.0
VLYNQ
HDD
RTC
UART/IrDA
PCI
SPI
GPIO

This board is provided by Texas Instruments' 3rd Party Partner, Einfochips

Features 
Montavista Linux 2.6.10
4 Channel SD or 1 Channel HD
RoHS Compliant

Possible application areas 
Video encoding and transcoding
Video surveillance
Video gateways
Video conferencing
Medical imaging

References
DVPB-HD

External links 
TMS320DM6446 Specifications
DaVinci Developers Wiki (hosted by TI)
DVPB-HD

Graphics hardware